George Chance may refer to:

 George Chance (footballer) (1896–1952), English professional footballer
 George Chance (photographer) (1885–1963), New Zealand pictorialist photographer
 Sir (George) Jeremy ffolliott Chance (born 1926), of the Chance baronets
 George Quentin Chance - Irish radiologist